Sonja "Soni" Malaj (born 23 October 1981), also known mononymously as Soni, is an Albanian singer, songwriter and dancer.

Life and career

Soni Malaj was born on 23 October 1981 into an Albanian family in the city of Tropojë, then part of the People's Republic of Albania, present Albania. Her real name is Sonja Malaj. She spent her childhood until the age of 9 in Tropoja. The family then moved to Tirana where Soni would continue her career as a singer.

She has participated in competitions like "Top Fest" (2006), and she placed second in Kënga Magjike with Flori Mumajesi, with the song "Fluturimi 3470". After Serbian singer Marija Šerifović won Eurovision Song Contest 2007, there was speculation that her winning song Molitva was actually plagiarism of Soni Malaj's song Ndarja. Soni Malaj also won Top Fest 11.

She was a jury and coach at the 2nd and 3rd edition of the Talent Show "X Factor".

In 2018, Malaj unsuccessfully attempted to represent Albania in the Eurovision Song Contest 2019, after finishing fifth at the 57th edition of Festivali i Këngës with the song "Më e fortë". In March 2021, Televizioni Klan (TV Klan) announced her as one of the contestants selected to compete at the 22nd edition of Kënga Magjike.

Discography

Albums 
 Nuk qaj për ty (2002)
 Mbretëresha e natës (2003)
 E vogëla (2005)
 Mesdhe (2006)
 Unik (2010)

Singles

As lead artist

References

External links 

1981 births
21st-century Albanian women singers
Albanian dancers
Albanian showgirls
Albanian songwriters
Albanian-language singers
Festivali i Këngës contestants
Living people
People from Tropojë